Music in the Parks is a day-long  or two-day festival for student choral, orchestral, and band ensembles, held annually across the United States. Music groups perform before adjudicators who rate the ensemble in the morning, and then spend the day at an amusement park. The day culminates with an awards ceremony. Awards can be given to either a single player or a whole ensemble.

The festivals are organized by the Educational Programs Network.

Company information
The program was first founded in 1981 by Dr. James R. Wells. The Educational Programs Networks hosts over 200,000 music students each year.

Locations
Busch Gardens Tampa Bay            Tampa, FL
Busch Gardens Williamsburg     Williamsburg, VA
California's Great America     Santa Clara, CA
Carowinds                      Charlotte, NC
Cedar Point                    Sandusky, OH
Darien Lake                    Buffalo, NY
Disneyland Resort              Anaheim, CA
Dollywood                      Pigeon Forge, TN
Dorney Park & Wildwater Kingdom Allentown, PA
Elitch Gardens                 Denver, CO
Hersheypark                    Hershey, PA
Kennywood                      Pittsburgh, PA
Kings Dominion                 Richmond, VA
Kings Island                   Cincinnati, OH
Knotts Berry Farm              Anaheim, CA
Lagoon                         Salt Lake City, UT
Lake Compounce                 Bristol, CT
Morey's Piers                  Wildwood, NJ
Oaks Park  Portland, OR
Santa Cruz Beach Boardwalk     Santa Cruz, CA
Sea World Orlando              Orlando, FL
Sea World San Diego            San Diego, CA
Silver Dollar City             Branson, MO
Silverwood                     Coeur D'Alene, ID
Six Flags America              Largo, MD
Six Flags Discovery Kingdom     Vallejo, CA
Six Flags Fiesta Texas         San Antonio, TX
Six Flags Great Adventure      Jackson, NJ
Six Flags Great America        Chicago, IL
Six Flags Magic Mountain       Los Angeles, CA
Six Flags New England          Agawam, MA
Six Flags Over Georgia         Atlanta, GA
Six Flags Over Texas           Dallas, TX
Six Flags St. Louis            St. Louis, MO
Universal Orlando              Orlando FL
Universal Studios Hollywood    Universal City, CA
Valleyfair                     Minneapolis, MN
Wild Waves Theme Park                     Seattle, WA
Worlds of Fun                  Kansas City, MO

Categories

There are many different categories in the Music in the Parks festival.  There are categories for band, Orchestra, and choir.  Each of these has a high school and junior high/middle school category.  The categories are then split up into A or AA, depending on the size of the school.  Also, there are different types of band, orchestra, and choir, such as concert band, jazz band, mixed choir, and women's choir.  Finally, there are other awards given that are based on overall achievement or attitude, as well as for an individual member of a group.

Awards 

Once the group, orchestra, band and/or choir performs at the performance area, they go to the amusement park of the director's choice, and at night, they go to the location of which they are told, according to where they performed, and are given their awards at a ceremony. Students from each group are asked to represent the school or group and receive the award in honor of the school. Every group gets an award, and there are rankings (1st, 2nd, 3rd, and so on) according to how many groups entered. There are also scales on which how you performed (90 - 100% = Superior, 80 - 89.9% = Excellent, 70-79.9% = Good, 60 - 69.9% = Fair, 50 - 59% = Poor, and <50 = Participant) But even if you win 1st, you are not guaranteed Superior, and if you are placed last, you can still be Superior (since that is based on the performance score).

External links 
 Music in the Parks official website.

Music festivals in the United States